The S.V. Cynthia Woods was a sailing vessel owned by Texas A&M University at Galveston (TAMUG) and used by The TAMUG Sailing Team. It was manufactured in 2005 and donated to TAMUG by billionaire philanthropist and Texas A&M University graduate George P. Mitchell. The Cynthia Woods was named for his wife Cynthia Woods Mitchell.

2008 Vessel Capsize in Gulf of Mexico
On June 6, 2008, the Cynthia Woods set sail in the Regatta de Amigos with a 6-person crew consisting of the captain (a university employee), along with four sailing team members (TAMUG students), and one safety officer who was a volunteer. The sailing yacht commenced the sailboat race in Galveston, Texas at 2:00p.m. local time. The Cape Fear 38 was destined for a  salt water sailing cruise along the Gulf of Mexico coast to Veracruz, Mexico with the Regatta Amigos occurring at the Isla Mujeres island.

The Cape Fear monohull is believed to have lost its  bulb keel jeopardized by a fluctuating sea state in the night. The Northern Hemisphere subtropical zone was mercurial with severe weather encompassing Tropical Storm Alma and Tropical Storm Arthur developing as a perfect storm phenomenon situated along the east coast of Central America and the Yucatán Channel of the Caribbean Sea by late May and early June 2008.

The Cape Fear 38 was equipped with two search and rescue transponders: a main one attached to the boat and a portable one provided by race officials for monitoring. The main transponder stopped working around midnight on June 6 and the portable stopped working around 9:00a.m. the next morning. The crew missed their scheduled 8:00a.m. check-in call on June 7.

Safety officer Roger Stone woke the crew in the lower deckhouse alerting the squad of the boat consuming seawater before Mr. Stone became displaced in the marginal sea. A sailboat yacht matching the description of the missing Cape Fear  monohull was spotted in a capsized state by a Coast Guard aircraft at 5:15p.m. on June 8, 2008. The navigational crew orderly escaped the turtling sloop while staying afloat using four personal flotation devices in four-to-six-foot seas for 26 hours before being found by the United States Coast Guard air-sea rescue and subsequently culled from the Gulf of Mexico waters. The survivors were lifted to safety by helicopter at around 1:00a.m. on June 8 and flown to a hospital in Galveston for treatment.

Recovery of Cape Fear 38
During the premier A.M. hours of June 7, 2008, the Cape Fear  sloop evolved into a distress signal with consequential vessel stability hardship conditions at a sea depth of  remotely situated from the Texas Gulf Coast.

See also
 Racer's hurricane

References

External links
 
 
 
 
 

Texas A&M University System
Texas A&M University